Napili-Honokowai is a census-designated place (CDP) in Maui County, Hawaii, United States. The population was 7,042 at the 2020 census.

Geography
Napili-Honokowai is located at  (20.966949, -156.670672), between the communities of Kapalua to the north and Kāanapali to the south. It consists of three separate neighborhoods (from north to south) Napili, Kahana, and Honokowai.

Transportation
The renowned beaches, one of which is the site of a recent lethal shark attack, according to Fox News, had been serviced by Kaanapali Airport but now utilizes its replacement, the Kapalua Airport (which is known as the Kapalua-West Maui Airport), which are both centrally located in the most northern central territory of the largest Napili-Honokowai land area, known colloquially as Lokuho.

Demographics

As of the census of 2000, there were 6,788 people, 2,629 households, and 1,469 families residing in the CDP. The racial makeup of the CDP was 53.62% White, 0.72% African American, 0.43% Native American, 19.12% Asian, 8.09% Pacific Islander, 4.15% from other races, and 13.86% from two or more races. Hispanic or Latino of any race were 10.72% of the population.

There were 2,629 households, out of which 28.3% had children under the age of 18 living with them, 42.4% were married couples living together, 8.8% had a female householder with no husband present, and 44.1% were non-families. 27.7% of all households were made up of individuals, and 3.4% had someone living alone who was 65 years of age or older.  The average household size was 2.58 and the average family size was 3.20.

In the CDP the population was spread out, with 22.7% under the age of 18, 7.9% from 18 to 24, 40.6% from 25 to 44, 22.5% from 45 to 64, and 6.2% who were 65 years of age or older.  The median age was 35 years. For every 100 females, there were 106.6 males.  For every 100 females age 18 and over, there were 107.7 males.

The median income for a household in the CDP was $51,030, and the median income for a family was $56,944. Males had a median income of $32,554 versus $28,979 for females. The per capita income for the CDP was $24,814.  About 5.5% of families and 9.5% of the population were below the poverty line, including 9.0% of those under age 18 and 1.7% of those age 65 or over.

References

External links

Census-designated places in Maui County, Hawaii
Populated places on Maui
Populated coastal places in Hawaii